Scott Davis (born January 29, 1972) is an American former competitive figure skater. He is a two-time (1993–94) U.S. national champion and represented the United States at the 1994 Winter Olympics, where he placed 8th.

Career 
Davis began his career when he won the U.S. junior national title during the 1989–90 season and began competing on the senior level nationally the following season.

In the 1992–93 season, Davis won silver at 1992 Skate America and 1992 Skate Canada International. He went on to win his first senior national title at the 1993 U.S. Championships and was assigned to his first senior World Championships where he placed sixth.

In 1993–94, Davis won silver at the 1993 Nations Cup and bronze at Piruetten. At the 1994 U.S. Championships, he repeated as national champion by defeating the 1988 Olympic gold medalist, Brian Boitano. Davis was sent to the 1994 Winter Olympics, where he finished eighth, and to the 1994 World Championships, where he placed seventh.

Davis won silver at the 1995 U.S. Championships and placed seventh again at the World Championships. In the following years, he suffered from vertigo and had problems with his jump consistency. Davis never again qualified for a World or Olympic team and retired from amateur competition in 1998. Known for his spinning ability, he was coached by Kathy Casey in Colorado Springs and Galina Zmievskaya in Simsbury, Connecticut.

After turning professional, Davis appeared in an ice show production of the musical Grease. He later became a coach in Calgary, Alberta, Canada. His students have included Vaughn Chipeur, Kaiya Ruiter and Ethan Scott. Davis is also an ISU Technical Specialist. He was a technical specialist for the men's event at the 2006 World Championships.

Personal life 
Davis was born and raised in Great Falls, Montana. He is married to Stephanie LaRiviere, with whom he has a daughter, Maggie.

Results
GP: Champions Series (Grand Prix)

References

External links 
 

1972 births
American male single skaters
Olympic figure skaters of the United States
Figure skaters at the 1994 Winter Olympics
Living people
Sportspeople from Great Falls, Montana
International Skating Union technical specialists